Laikin is a Pakistani television series aired on A-Plus TV. It features Ali Abbas, Sara Khan and Farhan Ahmed Malhi. Premiering on 27 April 2017, Laikin ended its run on 5 October 2017 after telecasting 24 episodes. The series marks the second appearance of Indian actress Sara Khan after Bay Khudi (2016).

Cast
Ali Abbas
Sara Khan
Faria Sheikh
Farhan Ahmed Malhi
Atiqa Odho
Beena Chaudhary
Firdous Jamal
Ghazala Kaifee
Fariya Hassan as Kiran
Muhammad Awais Waseer
Shazia Qaiser
Sajid Shah
Nida Mumtaz
Haider Raza
Akhtar Ghazali
Farhat Naseer
Tanveer Abbas
Nasreen Qureshi
Naeem Sheikh

References

External links
Official website

Pakistani drama television series
Urdu-language television shows
Punjabi-language television shows
2017 Pakistani television series debuts
2017 Pakistani television series endings